The Gallinger Municipal Hospital Psychopathic Ward consisted of three hospital buildings in the Southeastern Quadrant of Washington, D.C.

History
These buildings were built in 1920–1923 to the Colonial Revival design of Washington architect Snowden Ashford. Local contractor George H. Wynne constructed the buildings for $766,200. By 1924 it had been featured in the journal Modern Hospital and was also described in 1928 in the standard text The American Hospital of the Twentieth Century.

The hospital was named for Senator Jacob Harold Gallinger of New Hampshire, who sponsored the bill for its construction in the Senate.

It was renamed D.C. General Hospital in 1953, and closed in 2001.

Construction of a prison on the site was planned in 1986, with preservationists contesting the plan until 1989. The buildings were listed on the National Register of Historic Places in February, 1989 and were demolished c. 1990.

References

External links
Gallinger Hospital, Ghosts of DC

Psychiatric hospitals in Washington, D.C.
Hospital buildings completed in 1920
Government buildings on the National Register of Historic Places in Washington, D.C.
Historic districts on the National Register of Historic Places in Washington, D.C.
Hospital buildings on the National Register of Historic Places in Washington, D.C.
Historic American Buildings Survey in Washington, D.C.
Colonial Revival architecture in Washington, D.C.
Municipal hospitals
1920 establishments in Washington, D.C.